Sepphoris, known in Hebrew as Tzipori and in Arabic as Saffuriya since the 7th century, is an archaeological site located in the central Galilee region of Israel,  north-northwest of Nazareth. The site holds a rich and diverse historical and architectural legacy that includes Hellenistic, ancient Jewish, Roman, Byzantine, early Islamic, Crusader, Mamluk and Ottoman remains. In the Roman period, it was also called Diocaesaraea. In Mandatory Palestine, Saffuriya was a Palestinian Arab town with a population of approximately 5000 people at the time of its depopulation in 1948.

Since Late Antiquity, it was believed to be the birthplace of the Mary, mother of Jesus, and the village where Saints Anna and Joachim are often said to have resided, where today a fifth—century basilica is excavated at the site honouring the birth of Mary. Notable structures at the site include a Roman theatre, two early Christian churches, a Crusader fort partly rebuilt by Zahir al-Umar in the 18th century, and over sixty different mosaics dating from the third to the sixth century CE.

Following the Bar Kokhba revolt of 132–135, Sepphoris was one of the Galilean centers where rabbinical families from neighboring Judea relocated. Remains of a synagogue dated to the first half of the fifth century were discovered on the northern side of town. In the 7th century, the town was conquered by the Arab Rashidun armies during the Muslim conquest of the Levant. Successive Muslim dynasties ruled the area until the Crusades.

Until its depopulation during the 1948 Arab–Israeli War, Saffuriya was a Palestinian Arab village. Moshav Tzippori was established adjacent to the site in 1949.

The area where the remains of the ancient city have been excavated, occupied until 1948 by the Arab village, was designated an archaeological reserve named Tzipori National Park in 1992.

Etymology

Zippori / Tzipori; Sepphoris
In Ancient Greek, the city was called Sepphoris from its Hebrew name Tzipori, understood to be a variant of the Hebrew word for bird, tzipor – perhaps, as a Talmudic gloss suggests, because it is "perched on the top of a mountain, like a bird".

Eirenopolis and Neronias
Sepphoris issued its first coins at the time of the First Jewish War, in c. 68 CE, while Vespasian's army was reconquering the region from the rebels. The inscriptions on the coins are honouring both the emperor in Rome, Nero (r. 54–68), and his general, Vespasian, as they read 'Under Vespasian, 'Eirenopolis-Neronias-Sepphoris'. The name 'Neronias' honours Nero, while the name 'Eirenopolis' declares Sepphoris to be a 'city of peace' (eirene is a Greek word for national tranquillity and peace, with polis meaning city). Celdrán interprets this name choice as the result of the city's cultural synthesis between three elements – Jewish faith, moderated by the exposure to Greek philosophy and made more tolerant than other, more fanatic contemporary orthodox Jewish places, and a pragmatism which suited the Roman ideology. Celdrán notes that the name Sepphoris was reinstated before the end of Antoninus Pius's rule.

Diocaesarea
Peter Schäfer (1990), also citing G. F. Hill's conclusions based on his numismatic work done a century earlier, considers that the city's name was changed to Diocaesarea in 129/30, just prior to the Bar Kokhba revolt, in Hadrian's time. This gesture was done in honour of the visiting Roman emperor and his identification with Zeus Olympias, reflected in Hadrian's efforts in building temples dedicated to the supreme Olympian god. Celdrán (1995) places this name change a few decades later, during the time of Emperor Antoninus Pius (r. 138–161), when the city minted coins using this name, and interprets it as proof of the city's high degree of Hellenisation. Celdrán notes that the name Sepphoris was reinstated before the end of Antoninus Pius's rule.

This name was not used by Jewish writers, who continued to refer to it as Zippori.

History

Canaanite and Israelite Zippori in Hebrew Bible, Mishnah, Talmud
The Hebrew Bible makes no mention of the city, although in Jewish tradition it is thought to be the city Kitron mentioned in the Book of Judges (1:30).

According to Mishna 'Arakhin 9:6, the old fortress of Sepphoris was encompassed by a wall prior to the putative Israelite conquest of Canaan under Joshua.

Iron Age findings
Evidence from ceramic remains indicates the site of Sepphoris was inhabited during the Iron Age, 1,000–586 BCE.

Hellenistic period; Hasmoneans
Actual occupation and building work can be verified from the 4th century BCE, with the Hellenistic period.

In 104 BCE, the Judean priestly dynasty of the Hasmoneans conquered Galilee under the leadership of either Alexander Jannaeus or Aristobulus I and at this time the town may have been administered by a quarter-master, probably Jewish, and by the middle of the 1st century BCE, after the campaigns of Pompey, it fell under Roman rule in 63 BCE. Around 57 BCE, the city became one of the five synods of Roman influence in the Near East.

Herodian, later Roman, and Byzantine periods
The Roman client king, Herod the Great recaptured the city in 37 BCE after it had been garrisoned by the Parthian proxy, the Hasmonean Antigonus II Mattathias.

After Herod's death in 4 BCE, a rebel named Judas, son of a local bandit, Ezekias, attacked Sepphoris, then the administrative center of the Galilee, and, sacking its treasury and weapons, armed his followers in a revolt against Herodian rule. The Roman governor in Syria, Varus is reported by Josephus - perhaps in an exaggeration, since archaeology has failed to verify traces of the conflagration - to have burnt the city down, and sold its inhabitants into slavery. After Herod's son, Herod Antipas was made tetrarch, or governor, he proclaimed the city's new name to be Autocratoris, and rebuilt it as the "Ornament of the Galilee" (Josephus, Ant. 18.27). An ancient route linking Sepphoris to Legio, and further south to Samaria-Sebastia, is believed to have been paved by the Romans around this time. The new population was loyal to Rome.

Maurice Casey writes that, although Sepphoris during the early first century was "a very Jewish city", some of the people there did speak Greek. A lead weight dated to the first century bears an inscription in Greek with three Jewish names. Several scholars have suggested that Jesus, while working as a craftsman in Nazareth, may have travelled to Sepphoris for work purposes, possibly with his father and brothers. Casey states that this is entirely possible, but is likewise impossible to historically verify. Jesus does not seem to have visited Sepphoris during his public ministry and none of the sayings recorded in the Synoptic Gospels mention it.

The inhabitants of Sepphoris did not join the revolt against Roman rule of 66 CE. The Roman legate in Syria, Cestius Gallus, killed some 2,000 "brigands and rebels" in the area. The Jerusalemite Josephus, a son of Jerusalem's priestly elite had been sent north to recruit the Galilee into the rebellion's fold, but was only partially successful. He made two attempts to capture Sepphoris, but failed to conquer it, the first time because of fierce resistance, the second because a garrison came to assist in the city's defence. Around the time of the rebellion Sepphoris had a Roman theater – in later periods, bath-houses and mosaic floors depicting human figures. Sepphoris and Jerusalem may be seen to symbolize a cultural divide between those that sought to avoid any contact with the surrounding Roman culture and those who within limits, were prepared to adopt aspects of that culture. Rejected by Sepphoris and forced to camp outside the city Josephus went on to Jotapata, which did seem interested in the rebellion, – the Siege of Yodfat ended on 20 July 67 CE. Towns and villages that did not rebel were spared and in Galilee they were the majority. Coins minted in the city at the time of the Great Revolt carried the inscription Neronias and Eirenopolis, "City of Peace". After the revolt, coins bore depictions of laurel wreaths, palm trees, caduceuses and ears of barley, which appear on Jewish coinage albeit not exclusively.

George Francis Hill and Peter Schäfer consider that the city's name was changed to Diocaesarea in 129/30, just prior to the Bar Kokhba revolt, in Hadrian's time. This gesture was done in honour of the visiting Roman emperor and his identification with Zeus Olympias, reflected in Hadrian's efforts in building temples dedicated to the supreme Olympian god. Following the revolt in 132–135, many Jewish refugees from devastated Judea settled there, turning it into a center of Jewish religious and spiritual life. Rabbi Yehuda Hanasi, the compiler of the Mishnah, a commentary on the Torah, moved to Sepphoris, along with the Sanhedrin, the highest Jewish religious court. Before moving to Tiberias by 150, some Jewish academies of learning, yeshivot, were also based there. The Galilee was predominantly populated by Jews from the end of the 2nd century to the 4th century CE. As late as the third-fourth centuries, Sepphoris is believed to have been settled by one of the twenty-four priestly courses, Jedayah by name, a course mentioned in relation to the town itself in both the Jerusalem Talmud (Taanit 4:5) and in the Caesarea Inscription. Others, however, cast doubt about Sepphoris ever being under a "priestly oligarchy" by the third century, and that it may simply reflect a misreading of Talmudic sources.

In the aftermath of the Jewish revolt against Constantius Gallus of 351–352, Diocaesarea, the epicenter of the revolt, was razed. Philostorgius, speaking of these times, wrote: "The Jews of Diocæsarea (Sepphoris) also took up arms and invaded Palestine and the neighboring territories, with the design of shaking off the Roman yoke. On hearing of their insurrection, Gallus Caesar, who was then in Antioch, sent troops against them, defeated them, and destroyed Diocæsarea." Diocaesarea was further affected by the Galilee earthquake of 363, but rebuilt soon afterwards, and retained its importance in the greater Jewish community of the Galilee, both socially, commercially, and spiritually.

The town was also the center of a Christian bishopric. Three of its early bishops are known by name: Dorotheus (mentioned in 451), Marcellinus (mentioned in 518), and Cyriacus (mentioned in 536). As a diocese that is no longer residential, it is listed in the Annuario Pontificio among titular sees.

In the centuries between the rule of Herod Antipas and the end of the Byzantine era, (7th century), the city reportedly thrived as a center of learning, with a diverse, multiethnic and multireligious population of some 30,000 living in relatively peaceful coexistence.

Early Muslim period

The fourth century saw Jewish Zippori losing its centrality as the main Jewish city of the Galilee in favour of Tiberias, and its population dwindled away. With the Muslim conquest of the region, a new village rose on the ruins of ancient Zippori/Sepphoris, known by the name Saffuriya. Saffuriya's main development occurred during the Mamluk period (13th–16th centuries). Various Islamic dynasties controlled the site, with an interlude during the Crusades, from the 630s and up until World War I.

The ninth-century Islamic scholar Ya'qubi noted that Saffuriyyah was taken during the first conquest by the Arab armies in Palestine. in 634. Later, the city was incorporated into the expanding Umayyad Caliphate, and al-jund coins were minted by the new rulers. A stone-built aqueduct dating to the early Umayyad period (7th century CE) has been excavated. Saffuriya was engaged in trade with other parts of the empire at the time; for example, cloaks made in Saffuriyya were worn by people in Medina. Umayyad rule was replaced by Abbasid rule.

Crusader/Ayyubid and Mamluk periods

At the end of the 11th century, the Crusaders invaded the region and established the Crusader states, with the Kingdom of Jerusalem replacing the Islamic rule over Saffuriya. During the Crusader period, Sephoris/Saffuriya changed hands several times. The Crusaders built a fort and watchtower atop the hill, overlooking the town, and a church dedicated to Saint Anne, the mother of the Virgin Mary. In 1187, the field army of the Latin kingdom marched from their well-watered camp at Sephoris to be cut off and destroyed at the Battle of Hattin by the Ayyubid sultan, Saladin.

In 1255, the village and its fortifications were back in Crusader hands, as a document from that year shows it belonged to the archbishop of Nazareth, but by 1259, the bishop experienced unrest among the local Muslim farmers.
Saffuriyyah was captured between 1263 and 1266 by the Mamluk sultan Baybars.

Ottoman period

Saffuriya (also transliterated Safurriya and Suffurriye), came under the rule of the Ottoman Empire after it defeated the Mamluks at the Battle of Marj Dabiq in 1516. An Ottoman firman of 1572 describes Saffuriyya as one of a group of villages within the sanjak of Safad, which was part of the Qaysi faction, and that had rebelled against the Ottoman authorities. In 1596, the population was recorded as consisting of 366 families and 34 bachelors, all Muslim. Saffuriyya was larger than neighboring Nazareth but smaller than Kafr Kanna. The villagers paid a fixed tax rate of 25% on various agricultural products, including wheat, barley, olive trees, goats and beehives, in addition to a press for olive oil or grape syrup and "occasional revenues"; a total of 31,244 akçe. 3/24 of the revenuer went to a Waqf. A number of important scholars came from the village during this period, including the historian, poet and jurist al-Hasan al-Burini (d. 1615), the qadi (head judge), al-Baq'a al-Saffuri (d. 1625) and the poet and qadi Ahmad al-Sharif (d. 1633).

It is reported that in 1745 Zahir al-Umar, who grew up in the town, built a fort on the hill overlooking Saffuriya. A map from Napoleon's invasion of 1799 by Pierre Jacotin showed the place, named as Safoureh.

In the early 19th century, the British traveller J. Buckingham noted that all the inhabitants of Saffuriya were Muslim, and that the house of St. Anna had been completely demolished.

In the late 19th century, Saffuriyya was described as village built of stone and mud, situated along the slope of a hill. The village contained the remains of the Church of St. Anna and a square tower, said to have been built in the mid-18th century. The village had an estimated 2,500 residents, who cultivated 150 faddans (1 faddan = 100–250 dunams), on some of this land they had planted olive trees.

A population list from about 1887 showed that Sepphoris had about 2,940 inhabitants; all Muslims.

In 1900, an elementary school for boys was founded, and later, a school for girls.

Though it lost its centrality and importance as a cultural center under the Ottomans (1517–1918) and the British Mandate (1918–1948), the village thrived agriculturally. Saffuriyya's pomegranates, olives and wheat were famous throughout the Galilee.

British Mandate period

According to the British Mandate's 1922 census of Palestine, Saffuriyeh had 2,582 inhabitants; 2,574 Muslims and 8 Christians, where the Christians were all Roman Catholics.

By the 1931 census the population had increased to 3,147; 3,136 Muslims and 11 Christians, in a total of 747 houses. In summer of 1931, archaeologist Leroy Waterman began the first excavations at Saffuriya, digging up part of the school playground, formerly the site of the Crusader fort.

A local council was established in 1923. The expenditure of the council grew from 74 Palestine pound in 1929 to 1,217 in 1944.

In the 1945 statistics, the population was 4,330; 4,320 Muslims and 10 Christians, and the total land area was 55,378 dunams. In 1944/45 a total of 21,841 dunams of village land was used for cereals, 5,310 dunams were irrigated or used for orchards, mostly olive trees, while 102 dunams were classified as built-up land. By 1948, Saffuriya was the largest village in the Galilee both by land size and population.

State of Israel

The Arab village had a history of anti-Yishuv activities and supported the Arab Liberation Army during the 1948 Arab–Israeli War. On 1 July 1948, the village was bombarded by Israeli aircraft. On 16 July it was captured by Israeli forces along with the rest of the Lower Galilee in Operation Dekel. The villagers put up some resistance and managed to destroy several armoured cars in an ambush. Following the collapse of the resistance, all but 80 of the villagers fled. Some made their way northwards toward Lebanon, finally settling there in the refugee camps of Ain al-Hilweh and Shatila and the adjacent Sabra neighborhood. Others fled south to Nazareth and the surrounding countryside. After the attack, the villagers returned but were evicted again in September 1948. On 7 January 1949, 14 residents were deported and the remaining 550 were resettled in neighboring Arab villages such as 'Illut. Many settled in Nazareth in a quarter now known as the al-Safafira quarter because of the large number of Saffuriyya natives living there. As the Israeli government considers them present absentee, they cannot go back to their old homes and have no legal recourse to recover them. The works of the poet Taha Muhammad Ali, a native of Saffuriyya expelled from the town, and their relationship to the landscape of Saffuriya before 1948 are the subject of Adina Hoffman's My Happiness Bears No Relation to Happiness (Yale University Press, 2009). The area remained under martial law until the general lifting of martial law in Israel in 1966. Most of the remains of Saffuriya were removed in a late-1960s program to clear depopulated Arab villages. The site of the Arab village was planted with pine trees. By 2011, five books about the Palestinian village history had been published.

On 20 February 1949, the Israeli moshav of Tzippori was founded southeast of the older village. The pomegranate and olive trees were replaced with crops for cattle fodder.

Archaeological park

Roman and Byzantine city
Much of the town has been excavated, revealing Jewish homes along a main cobblestone street. Several images have been found carved into the stones of the street, including that of a menorah, and another image that resembles some ancient game reminiscent of tic-tac-toe. Stepped pools have been uncovered throughout Sepphoris, and it is generally believed that these may well have been used as Mikva'ot, Jewish ritual baths.

Roman theatre
The Roman theatre sits on the northern slope of the hill, and is about 45 m in diameter, seating 4500. Most of it is carved into the hillside, but some parts are supported by separate stone pillars. The theatre shows evidence of ancient damage, possibly from the earthquake in 363.

Nile mosaic villa
A modern structure stands to one side of the excavations, overlooking the remains of a 5th-century public building with a large and intricate mosaic floor. Some believe the room was used for festival rituals involving a celebration of water, and possibly covering the floor in water. Drainage channels have been found in the floor, and the majority of the mosaic seems devoted to measuring the floods of the Nile, and celebrations of those floods.

Dionysus mosaic villa

A Roman villa, built around the year 200, contains an elaborate mosaic floor in what is believed to have been a triclinium. In Roman tradition, seating would have been arranged in a U-shape around the mosaic for guests to recline as they ate, drank and socialised. The mosaic features images of Dionysus, god of wine and of socialising, along with Pan and Hercules in several of the 15 panels. The mosaic depicts a wine-drinking contest between Dionysus and Hercules.

The most famous image is that of a young woman, possibly representing Venus, which has been dubbed the "Mona Lisa of the Galilee". Smaller mosaic tesserae were used, which allowed for greater detail and a more lifelike result, as seen in the shading and blush of her cheeks.

Byzantine-period synagogue

The remains of a 5th-century synagogue have been uncovered in the lower section of the city. Measuring 20.7 meters by 8 meters wide, it was located at the edge of the town. The mosaic floor is divided into seven parts. Near the entrance is a scene showing the angels visiting Sarah. The next section shows the binding of Isaac. There is a large zodiac with the names of the months written in Hebrew. A depiction of the Greek sun god Helios sits in the middle, in his chariot. The last section shows two lions flanking a wreath, their paws resting on the head of an ox.

The mosaic shows the "tamid" sacrifice, the showbread, and the basket of first fruits form the Temple in Jerusalem. Also shown are a building facade, probably representing the Temple, incense shovels, shofars, and the seven-branched menorah from the Temple. Another section shows Aaron dressed in priestly robes preparing to offer sacrifices of oil, flour, a bull and a lamb.

An Aramaic inscription reads "May he be remembered for good Yudan son of Isaac the Priest and Paragri his daughter Amen Amen"

Crusader tower
The Crusader fortress on the hill overlooking the Roman theater was built in the 12th century on the foundation of an earlier Byzantine structure. The fortress is a large square structure, 15m x15m, and approximately 10 m. high. The lower portion of the building consists of reused antique spolia, including a sarcophagus with decorative carvings. The upper part of the structure and the doorway were added by Zahir al-Umar in the 18th century. Noticeable features from the rebuilding are the rounded corners which are similar to those constructed under Zahir in the fort in Shefa-'Amr. The upper part of the building was used as a school during the reign of Abdul Hamid II in the early 1900s (late Ottoman era), and used for this purpose until 1948.

Excavation history
Since 1990 large areas of Zippori have been excavated by an archaeological team working on behalf of the Hebrew University's Institute of Archaeology.

In 2012, a survey of the site was conducted by Zidan Omar on behalf of the Israel Antiquities Authority (IAA). In June 2018, archaeologists discovered two subterranean Byzantine-period wine presses at Tzippori National Park.

See also
Al-Burini (1556-1615), Damascus-based Ottoman Arab historian, poet, and Shafi'i jurist
Battle of Cresson between Crusaders and Muslim troops in 1187, possibly at the Springs of Sepphoris
Jesus Trail, 65 km (40 mi) hiking and pilgrimage route in the Galilee passing through Sepphoris
Oldest synagogues in the world
Shikhin (ancient Asochis), village 1.5 km north of Sepphoris, major pottery production centre in Roman Galilee
Taha Muhammad Ali (1931–2011), Palestinian poet born in Saffuriyya

Notes

References

Bibliography

 
 
 

 
 
 
 
 
 
 
 
 

 
 
 
Heyd, Uriel (1960): Ottoman Documents on Palestine, 1552–1615, Oxford University Press, Oxford. Cited in Petersen (2002)

External links

 Tzippori excavation project Hebrew University of Jerusalem
 Saffuriyya Palestine Remembered
 Safuriyya, Zochrot
 Survey of Western Palestine, Map 5: IAA, Wikimedia commons
 Saffuryeh, from Dr. Moslih Kanaaneh
 Zippori  Hillel International
 Zippori Israel Ministry of Foreign Affairs. (Accessed 9 February 2005.)
 Zippori National Park, official brochure with site map. (Accessed 27 December 2019.)
Photos of Sepphoris from the Manar al-Athar photo archive

Populated places established in the 5th millennium BC
Ancient Israel and Judah
Archaeological sites in Israel
Crusader castles
Castles and fortifications of the Kingdom of Jerusalem
Castles in Israel
National parks of Israel
Diocaesarea in Palaestina
District of Nazareth
Arab villages depopulated during the 1948 Arab–Israeli War
Mosaics
Talmud places
Populated places in Northern District (Israel)
Roman towns and cities in Israel
Ancient Jewish settlements of Galilee
Church buildings in the Kingdom of Jerusalem
Israeli mosaics